Ori is a Hebrew given name, for males and females (though more common for males) which means "my light”. Also a name from the Hebrew Bible (Isaiah chapter 60). A female name with a similar meaning and sound is Orit (meaning "A small light"). The name Ori may refer to:

Ori Biton (born 1987), Israeli footballer
Ori Calif (born 1977), Israeli lawyer
Ori Elon (born 1981), Israeli writer and filmmaker
Ori Gersht (born 1967), Israeli photographer
Ori Kaplan (born 1969), Israeli musician
Ori Kritz (born 1958), Israeli historian
Ori Orr (born 1939), Israeli former general and politician
Ori Reisman (1924–1991), Israeli painter
Ori Shitrit (born 1986), Israeli football player
Ori Sivan (born 1963), Israeli director and screenwriter
Ori Uzan (born 1978), Israeli football assistant manager and former player
Ori Yogev (born 1960), Israeli businessman

See also
Ori (disambiguation)

Hebrew-language names

References